The Riffelalp tram (RiT) is a high altitude tramway line located in the Swiss canton of Valais near the resort of Zermatt. The line links the Riffelalp Resort to Riffelalp station, on the Gornergrat railway, and via that line to Zermatt and beyond.

The Riffelalp tram is the highest tram line in Europe.

History
The Riffelalp Grand Hotel, the predecessor of today's Riffelalp Resort, was opened by Alexander Seiler in 1884. In 1898, the Gornergrat railway was opened, linking Zermatt to the summit of the Gornergrat. The line included a station called Riffelalp, but this was situated some distance from the resort.

In order to provide better access to the station, the hotel built the Riffelalp tram. The line opened on 13 July 1899, one year after the opening of the Gornergrat railway. The tram operated in the summer months only.

During the night of 14 February 1961, the Riffelalp Grand Hotel was destroyed in a fire. The original tram vehicles survived the fire, but without traffic from the hotel, tram service was suspended, it had last run on September 30, 1960. The vehicles were taken to Zermatt for storage, and the line remained closed for the next 40 years.

In 1998, work started on the construction of the new Riffelalp Resort on the site of the old grand hotel. As part of this reconstruction, the tram line was relaid on its original route. The wooden bodies of the original cars had deteriorated in storage, whilst modern safety standards precluded the reintroduction of the original three-phase supply. The original cars were therefore rebuilt with replacement bodies and using battery power. The new line was opened on 15 June 2001.

Operation

At the station end of the line, the tram shares the building of the station and is linked to its cargo ramp. This is the highest station in Europe where two different railways meet, the Riffelalp station itself being one of the highest open-air stations. However, there is no direct connection to the Gornergrat railway, which is of  gauge. At the resort end of the line, there is a terminal loop and a depot for the trams, with a battery station.

There are two trams in use, along with a goods trailer. The battery is partially recharged during the electric braking operation.

The service operates during the resort's summer season, which runs from June to September. It is the access route recommended for its guests by the Riffelalp Resort, who provide porter assistance at both Zermatt and Riffelalp stations. During the resort's winter season, from December to April, a snowmobile service is provided in place of the tram.

Gallery

Literature 
 Wolfgang Finke: Die Fahrzeuge der Zermattbahnen in über 1100 Fahrzeugzeichnungen (DVD book). Verlag tram-TV, Cologne 2010 - 
 Florian Inäbnit: Riffelalp-Tram; Einst und jetzt. Prellbock Druck & Verlag, Leissigen 2005 - 
 Florian Inäbnit: Trambahn Mürren, Elektrische Trambahn Riffelalp und Pferdebahn Bellavista. Prellbock Druck & Verlag, Leissigen 1995

See also 
 List of heritage railways and funiculars in Switzerland
 800 mm gauge railways

References

External links 

Riffealptram on Riffelalp Resort website (English version)
 Riffelalptram on Strassenbahn-Europa website
 Images and infos about Riffelalptram

Railway lines in Switzerland
800 mm gauge railways in Switzerland
Mountain railways
Tram transport in Switzerland
Transport in Zermatt
Railway lines opened in 1899
Railways using three-phase power
1899 establishments in Switzerland
Heritage railways in Switzerland